Lyons House may refer to:

in Australia
 Lyons House, a heritage listed house at 733 Port Hacking Rd, Dolans Bay, New South Wales.

in Ireland
 Lyons House, County Kildare, Ireland

in the United States (by state)
Horace G. Lyons House, Berryton, Kansas, listed on the NRHP in Kansas
Lyons House (Abbeville, Louisiana), listed on the NRHP in Louisiana 
Lyons House (Vinton, Louisiana), listed on the NRHP in Louisiana
Benson H. Lyons House, Leesville, Louisiana, listed on the NRHP in Louisiana
Joseph D. Lyons House, Sunderland, Maryland, listed on the NRHP in Maryland
Byers-Lyons House, Pittsburgh, Pennsylvania, listed on the NRHP in Pennsylvania
Frederick and Sallie Lyons House, Pleasanton, Texas, listed on the NRHP in Texas
Oscar F. Lyons House, Peoa, Utah, listed on the NRHP in Utah